The Canowindridae are a family of prehistoric lobe-finned fishes which lived during the Devonian period (Famennian stage, about 374 to 359 million years ago). Fossils of fishes that belonged to this family have been found in Australia, Antarctica, and Europe.

Phylogeny
Below is a cladogram from Swartz, 2012.

References

Devonian bony fish
Canowindrids
Prehistoric lobe-finned fish families
Late Devonian first appearances
Late Devonian animals
Late Devonian extinctions